Madongchuan is a town in Baota District, Yan'an, Shaanxi, China.

History 
Manmade grottoes dating back to the Song dynasty have been found in Madongchuan. The Shiyaowan Grotto contains a number of Buddha statues (many of which have now been partially or completed destroyed), and inscriptions dating back to the late 11th century.

On the evening of February 18, 1935, as part of the Chinese Civil War, forces of the Chinese Red Army clashed with 50  soldiers, aligned with Chiang Kai-Shek's Nationalist government, in the village of Jinpenwan. Red Army forces won the battle. Later in the Civil War, on May 11, 1947, Communist Party forces, now reorganized as the People's Liberation Army, clashed with Chiang's Nationalist Army again in Jinpenwan. On November 14 and November 15 later that year, Nationalist Army aircraft bombed the village.

From May through July 1950, an unidentified illness swept through the village of Jinpenwan, as well as other parts of present-day Baota District, killing 680 people.

Madongchuan was established as a people's commune in 1972. In 1984, it was changed to a township.

Geography 

The Fenchuan River, a minor river which flows from Nanniwan to Yichuan County and into the Yellow River, flows through Madongchuan. The Fenchuan Canal, a small canal off the Fenchuan River which irrigates nearby land, flows through Madongchuan, creating the Jinpenwan Reservoir. According to 1994 government publication, 62.3% of Madongchuan is forested.

Administrative divisions 
Madongchuan administers 10 administrative villages, as well as 38 natural villages, although the latter lacks any administrative jurisdiction. Madongchuan's government is located in Madongchuan Village. The town's 10 administrative villages are as follows:

 Madongchuan Village
 Jinpenwan Village
 Yuetun Village
 Xueshuiwan Village
 Shiyaowan Village
 Xicun Village
 Fancun Village
 Zhaotai Village
 Yaojiapo Village
 Quli Village

Demographics 
As per the 2010 Chinese Census, Madongchuan has a population of 6,544. This represents a significant decline from the 2000 Chinese Census, when its population totaled 10,416. In 1985, Madongchuan's population totaled 8,405. According to the 1982 Chinese Census, Madongchuan had a population of 8,257, all of whom were classified as ethnically Han Chinese. In the 1982 Census, Madongchuan had an average household size of 4.44 people. As of the 1964 Chinese Census, Madongchuan had a population of 4,241, all of whom were classified as ethnically Han Chinese.

Madongchuan has a recorded hukou population of 11,142 as of 2018.

Economy 
Major crops grown in Madongchuan include maize, tobacco, and vegetables.

A small hydropower plant known as the Dongwan Small Hydropower Plant was built in Madongchuan in 1958, and produces 1,000 Kilowatt-hour of electricity annually.

Transportation 
The S303 highway runs through Madongchuan.

See also
List of township-level divisions of Shaanxi

References

Baota District
Township-level divisions of Shaanxi
Towns in China